Jarle Rykkje is a Norwegian handball player.

He made his debut on the Norwegian national team in 2001, and played 79 matches for the national team between 2001 and 2008. He competed at the 2005 World Men's Handball Championship.

References

Year of birth missing (living people)
Living people
Norwegian male handball players